Amrithavaahini is a 1976 Indian Malayalam film,  directed by J. Sasikumar. The film stars Prem Nazir, Sharada, Thikkurisi Sukumaran Nair and Adoor Bhasi in the lead roles. The film has musical score by A. T. Ummer. The film was a remake of the 1963 Telugu movie Punarjanma which was also remade in Tamil in 1970 as Engirundho Vandhaal and in Hindi in 1970 as Khilona.

Cast
Prem Nazir as Vijayan
Thikkurisi Sukumaran Nair as Thampi
Adoor Bhasi as Vinod
Sharada as Geetha
Jayan as Mohan
Kaviyoor Ponnamma as Lakshmi
Prathapachandran as Doctor
Sukumari as Sumathi
Shoba as Rani
Sankaradi as Madhava Kurup
Meena as Dakshyayani
Sadhana
Reena as Thulasi
Nellikode Bhaskaran as Paramu Nair
M. G. Soman as Sudhakaran
Sreelatha Namboothiri as Daisy
P. R. Menon

Soundtrack
The music was composed by A. T. Ummer and the lyrics were written by Sreekumaran Thampi, Adoor Bhasi and Bharanikkavu Sivakumar.

References

External links
 

1976 films
1970s Malayalam-language films
Malayalam remakes of Telugu films
Films directed by J. Sasikumar